TONY BLACK is a Grammy-Winning music producer, mixer/engineer & songwriter/musician. He has contributed to recordings totaling more than 80 million units sold or downloaded.
He won a GRAMMY AWARD for his contribution to the album THE DIARY OF ALICIA KEYS for BEST R&B ALBUM.
He also mixed and recorded “RIDE OR DIE” on the Grammy-winning album Jay-Z Vol. 2... Hard Knock Life

Based in New York City, Black was a staff engineer at The Hit Factory from 1993 to 1998 where he worked with artists such as: Michael Jackson, Luther Vandross, Lil' Kim, Notorious B.I.G., Jay-Z, Nas, Wu Tang Clan and hundreds of other artists. 
After leaving The Hit Factory staff, he continues producing and engineering projects for numerous artists and record labels.
He was featured in the web series "Create or Else" by Ogilvy showcasing his abstract painting.

References

American record producers
American audio engineers
Hip hop record producers
Living people
Year of birth missing (living people)